Narasing Rao Kallurkar was an Indian civil servant and administrator. He was the administrator of Mahe from  9 November 1960 to 31 May 1967.

References 

 

Year of birth missing
Possibly living people
Administrators of Mahe